Tree Lake is a lake in the U.S. state of Wisconsin.

The name Tree Lake most likely is a corruption of Three Lakes, the latter name since there are smaller lakes on either side of it.

References

Lakes of Wisconsin
Bodies of water of Portage County, Wisconsin